Frank Ponce is the former quarterbacks coach for Miami (FL). He was previously the offensive coordinator for Appalachian State and before that quarterbacks coach at Louisville. He served as the co-offensive coordinator for Appalachian State from 2013 to 2018. He is now on his third stint as offensive coordinator and quarterback coach at Appalachian State.

References

External links
 Louisville Cardinals bio
 FIU Panthers bio

1971 births
Living people
American football quarterbacks
Appalachian State Mountaineers football coaches
Arizona Western Matadors football players
FIU Panthers football coaches
Louisville Cardinals football coaches
High school football coaches in Florida
Florida International University alumni
Miami Dade College alumni